Imtilemba Sangtam (25 December 1945 – 13 February 2020) was an Indian politician and member of the Bharatiya Janata Party. Sangtam was a member of the Nagaland Legislative Assembly from the Longkhim Chare constituency in Tuensang district.

Personal Background 

Imtilemba Sangtam was born on 25 December 1945. He is survived by his wife,son and two grand children. He was a post graduate from Cotton College,Guwahati and contested Nagaland Legislative Assembly elections three times from 52 Longkhim Chare constituency in Tuensang district. He had served as minister of Transport,Labour and Employment,Evaluation and Statistics from 2003-2008 and minister of Cooperation,Relief and Rehabilitation from 2013-2018.

He died on 14 February 2020 at Christian Institute of Health Sciences and Research after prolonged illness. He hailed from Chimonger village under Tuensang District.

References 

1945 births
2020 deaths
Bharatiya Janata Party politicians from Nagaland
Chief Ministers of Nagaland
Nagaland MLAs 2013–2018
Nationalist Congress Party politicians from Nagaland
People from Tuensang district
21st-century Indian politicians